Liddel Water is a river running through southern Scotland and northern England, for much of its course forming the border between the two countries, and was formerly one of the boundaries of the Debatable Lands.

Liddel Water's source is beneath Peel Fell in Roxburghshire, in the Scottish Borders, where it is formed by the confluence of Caddroun Burn, Wormscleuch Burn and Peel Burn (burn is the Scots term for a stream). Soon afterwards, the nascent Liddel Water is fed by Dawston Burn near the village of Saughtree.

The river continues to pick up tributaries (listed below) as it follows its southwesterly course, which takes it through the village of Newcastleton (also known as Copshaw Holm) to that of  Kershopefoot, where the burn begins to mark the Anglo-Scottish border.

Liddel Water then flows into the River Esk at Willow Pool, overlooked by the earthworks of the former castle of Liddel Strength near Carwinley, Cumbria.

Tributaries
Peel Burn
Wormscleuch Burn
Caddroun Burn
Wane Cleuch
Singdean Burn
Dawston Burn
Cooper Cleuch
Alison Sike
Cliffhope Burn
Kiln Burn (at Burnmouth Farm)
Riccarton Burn (at Riccarton Farm)
Larriston Burn (at Hewisbridge Cottage)
Storff Burn
Little Warrington Sike
Bught Sike
Holm Sikes
Boghall Burn (at Dinlabyre)
Riever Sike (at Ovenshank)
Hermitage Water (near Sandholm)
Hartsgarth Burn
Routing Burn
Thief Sike
Paddington Sike
Toftholm Sike
Roughley Burn
Watt's Burn
Roughley Sike
Laidlehope Burn
Leys Burn
Whitrope Burn
Pirryshiel Sike
Sundhope Burn
Black Cleuch
Windy Cleuch
Dinley Burn
Braidley Burn
Tongue Burn
Barley Burn
Crib Burn
Gorrenberry Burn
Billhope Burn
Langtae Sike
Chapel Grain
Caulker Grain
Twislehope Burn
Ryedale Burn (near Brox)
Ralton Burn
Burnt Burn
Rigging Sike
Black Burn (opposite Whithaugh)
Bedda Cleuch
Branch Cleuch
Hog Gill
Long Gill
Rough Gill
Priesthill Burn (at Whithaugh)
Tweeden Burn (at Tweeden Plantation)
Deep Sike
Tinnis Burn (opposite Kershopefoot)
Todhunter Grain
Black Grain
Green Burn
Kershope Burn (at Kershopefoot)
Clark's Sike
Muir Burn (near Bankhead)
Rae Gill
Whitlawside Burn (near Whitlawside)
Archer Beck (near Crookholm)
Mid Cleuch
Rowan Burn (at Rowanburnfoot)

See also
Rivers of Scotland
List of places in the Scottish Borders

Rivers of the Scottish Borders
Rivers of Cumbria
Rivers of Dumfries and Galloway
Anglo-Scottish border
1Liddel